Isaac Spitler House is a historic home and farm complex located near Luray, Page County, Virginia. The farmhouse was built in 1826, and is a two-story, brick dwelling with a gable roof.  A wing was added in 1857 to create an "L"-shaped building.  Located on the property are the contributing remains of a double-unit stone outbuilding which sheltered and sustained the original settlers (about 1738–1739) and two succeeding generations; chimney and remains of a log building; stone wellhouse and dairy; large vernacular Switzer or Swisher barn dated to the 1750s; combination wagon shed and corn crib; a set of stone steps which were used to assist persons in mounting horses and getting into wagons; two eight-foot-high stone gateposts; and a small family cemetery containing nine graves.

It was listed on the National Register of Historic Places in 1997.

References

Houses on the National Register of Historic Places in Virginia
Farms on the National Register of Historic Places in Virginia
Houses completed in 1826
Houses in Page County, Virginia
National Register of Historic Places in Page County, Virginia
1826 establishments in Virginia